Khalte is a part of Nilkantha municipality in Dhading District in the Bagmati pradesh of central Nepal.

It consists of the places like Phyakse, Khalte, Pateni, Pimalkhola, Shyaldadan, Paharechhap, Deurali, Ramche, Dada Gaun.

The majority of the population are involved in agriculture. Majority of the youths are gone for employment in foreign countries like Saudi Arabia, Qatar, UAE, Malaysia, Japan, and Australia.

This place is also known as the place of Maoist as lots of people of here have become martyr in Maoist movement of Nepal.

The ward office of Nilkantha-5 (Khalte) is located at Phyakse.

Population
At the 1991 Nepal census it had a population of 5750 and had 1087 houses in it.
According to 2021 Nepal census, the total population of the ward is 6530 with 1478 households.

References

Populated places in Dhading District